Charles Rivière is a French painter born in 1848 in Orléans and died in Paris  in 1920.

Biography
From 1903 onwards, Charles Rivière, a friend of Germain David-Nillet, made several visits to Le Faouët and there painted landscapes and religious paintings. He exhibited at the Paris Salon (Salon des artistes français).]

Works
His works include:-
  "Fin de combat. Bretagne. 1794".  This 1905 painting is held by the Musée d'art et d'histoire of Cholet.
  "Breton". This 1910 work hangs in the Musée du Faouët.
  "Le tambour de ville". A 1914 painting held in the Musée du Faouët.
  "Le vieux puits, place Bellanger". A 1914 painting held in the Musée du Faouët.
  "Chute de l'avion en flammes". Painting held in the Musée du Faouët.
  "Persannages  dans une étable" (Figures in a stable).

Gallery

References

19th-century French painters
French male painters
20th-century French painters
20th-century French male artists
Breton art
19th-century French male artists